Francisc Dican (born 26 October 1967) is a Romanian former football player who played as a midfielder and a coach.

Honours
Universitatea Cluj
Divizia B: 1991–92

References

1967 births
Living people
People from Borșa
Romanian footballers
Association football midfielders
CS Minaur Baia Mare (football) players
Victoria București players
FC Universitatea Cluj players
FC Gueugnon players
Nyíregyháza Spartacus FC players
Liga I players
Liga II players
Ligue 1 players
Nemzeti Bajnokság I players
Romanian expatriate footballers
Expatriate footballers in France
Expatriate footballers in Hungary
Expatriate sportspeople in Hungary
Romanian football managers
FC Universitatea Cluj managers
CFR Cluj managers
FK Csíkszereda Miercurea Ciuc managers